Emerging is the title of the only album by the Phil Keaggy Band, released in 1977 on NewSong Records. The album's release was delayed due to a shift in record pressing plant priorities following the death of Elvis Presley. The album was re-released on CD in 2000 as ReEmerging with one original track omitted and four newly recorded songs by the band members.

Track listing (1977 release)
All songs written by Phil Keaggy, unless otherwise noted.

Side one
 "Theme" (Phil Madeira) – 1:25 (instrumental)
 "Where Is My Maker?" – 2:25
 "Another Try" – 4:55
 "Ryan's Song" (inspired by a poem by Bill Clarke) – 3:09
 "Struck By the Love" (Madeira) – 5:43 (lead vocal: Phil Madeira)

Side two
 "Turned On the Light" – 4:57
 "Sorry" – 4:09
 "Take a Look Around" – 5:16
 "Gentle Eyes" – 5:29 (omitted from 2000 reissue)

Track listing (2000 re-release)
All songs written by Phil Keaggy, unless otherwise noted.

 "Theme" (Madeira)
 "Where Is My Maker?"
 "Another Try"
 "Ryan's Song"
 "Struck By the Love" (Madeira)
 "Turned On the Light"
 "Sorry"
 "Take a Look Around"
 "My Auburn Lady" - 4:26
 "Mighty Lord" (Madeira) - 4:43 (lead vocal: Phil Madeira)
 "You're My Hero" (Andersen/Keaggy) - 4:04 (lead vocal: Terry Andersen)
 "Amelia Earhart's Last Flight" (McEnery) - 3:17 (lead vocal: Dan Cunningham)

Personnel 
The Phil Keaggy Band
 Dan Cunningham – bass, vocals (CD reissue only)
Lynn Nichols – vocals, electric guitar, acoustic guitar (lead on "Struck by the Love"), classical guitar
Phil Keaggy – vocals, lead electric and acoustic guitar
Phil Madeira – vocals, piano, Hammond organ, Fender Rhodes, Micromoog and Polymoog synths
Terry Andersen – drums, vocals (CD reissue only)

Additional musicians
Karl Fruh – Cello on "Another Try"
Ray Papai – Sax on "Sorry"

Production notes
 Peter K. Hopper – producer
 Phil Keaggy – co-producer
 Gary Hedden – engineer, mixing

References 

1977 albums
Phil Keaggy albums